Panathur – Karike belt is on the border of Kasargod district of Kerala & Coorg and Dakshina Kannada districts in the Indian state of Karnataka. It is 44 km east of Kanhangad, 30 km from Bhagamandala in Kodagu and 22 km from Sullia in Dakshina Kannada. Kerala and Karnataka are separated by the Manjanadukkam Puzha River. In Panathur, people speak Malayalam and in Karike Kannada (mainly Are Bhashe). Marathi, Tulu, Konkani and Harijan Bashe are also spoken here. The area produces rubber, areconut, coconut, pepper and other agricultural products.

The main roads are Kanhangad-Panathur, Karike to Bhagamandala (through the dense Coorg forest) and another connects Panathur & Karike to Sullia through KPC and Kallapally. The three districts join in Kammadi. A community called Kudiyanmaar also lives here, speaking a mix of Tulu, Kannada and ancient Malayalam.

Temples and festivals
Thuloorvanath Bhagavathi Temple (Kizhakoolom) is the main visitor attraction. Thuloorvanath Bhagavathi and Munnayariswaran are the main deities. Kaliyattam starts on the day after Shivratri every year and continues for 8 days with 101 Theyyams. The temple stands for part ancient Thulunad, later called as Ombatham Naad which is from present Odayamchal to Chettimaani.

Other attractions are Madathumala (famous as Ranipuram - http://www.aboutkerala.co/2012/11/ranipuram-hills.html), Kallar, Peruthady etc. An ancient Temple named as kallar sree Mahavishnu Temple is situated at kallar about 14 km from Panathur, and 28 km eastwards from kanhangad.

Transportation
There is a 20 km road from Panathur to Sullia in Karnataka from where Bangalore and Mysore can be easily accessed. Locations in Kerala can be accessed by driving towards the western side. The nearest railway station is Kanhangad railway station on Mangalore-Palakkad line. There are airports at Mangalore and Calicut.

Geography of Kasaragod district
Geography of Dakshina Kannada district
Geography of Kodagu district